TSS Slievemore or Slieve More may refer to:

, a twin screw steamer passenger and cargo vessel operated by the London and North Western Railway from 1904 to 1923, and the London, Midland and Scottish Railway from 1923 to 1932.
, a twin screw steamer passenger vessel operated by the London, Midland and Scottish Railway from 1930 to 1948, and the British Transport Commission from 1948 to 1965.

Ship names